Philip Burton Jr. (December 9, 1934December 24, 2010) was a documentary filmmaker whose subjects included African-Americans and American government.

References

External links
 

1934 births
2010 deaths
American directors
Film directors from New York City
Deaths from Alzheimer's disease
Deaths from dementia in California
University of California, Los Angeles alumni